Ross Creek may refer to:

Australia 

Ross Creek (Central Queensland), a watercourse near Yeppoon in Central Queensland
Ross Creek (North Queensland), a watercourse that is a tributary of the Ross River, located southwest of Townsville in North Queensland
Ross Creek (Townsville, North Queensland), a watercourse that is an anabranch of the Ross River, located near Townsville in North Queensland
Ross Creek (Victoria), a rural locality on the Yarrowee River in Victoria
Ross Creek, Queensland, a locality in the Gympie Region, Queensland, Australia

Canada 

 Ross Creek, Nova Scotia, a community in King's County

New Zealand 

 Ross Creek, a small tributary of the Water of Leith in Dunedin
 Ross Creek Reservoir, Dunedin, New Zealand

United States 

 Ross Creek (Missouri), a stream in Missouri